After Forever is the fifth and final studio album by Dutch symphonic metal band After Forever. It was released in the United States on 28 September 2007. The album reached No. 6 on the Dutch album charts.

A 15th anniversary edition, with remastered songs and both previously released bonus tracks "Lonely" and "Sweet Enclosure", was released on 27 May 2022.

Track listing

Bonus DVD (US limited edition)
 "Discord" (music video)
 "Equally Destructive" (music video)
 "Energize Me" (music video)
 Photo Gallery

Personnel
After Forever
 Floor Jansen – vocals, soprano choir vocals
 Sander Gommans – guitars, grunts
 Bas Maas – guitars
 Luuk van Gerven – bass guitar
 Joost van den Broek – keyboards, orchestral and choral arrangements, engineering
 André Borgman – drums

Additional musicians
 Rannveig Sif Sigurdardottir – mezzo-soprano choir vocals
 Amanda Somerville – alto choir vocals
 Previn Moore – tenor and baritone choir vocals
 Jeff Waters – guitar solo on "De-Energized"
 Doro Pesch – vocals on "Who I Am"
 City of Prague Philharmonic Orchestra – orchestra
 Richard Hein – orchestra conductor

Production
 Gordon Groothedde – production, engineering, mixing
 Stephanie Pistel – photography
 Thomas Ewerhard – artwork, layout

Charts

References

2007 albums
After Forever albums
Nuclear Blast albums